Kigamboni District (officially known as Kigamboni Municipal Council) is a district of  Dar es Salaam, Tanzania.

Kigamboni District is divided into 9 administrative wards.

 Tungi
 Vijibweni
 Kimbiji
 Kisarawe II
 Kigamboni
 Mjimwema
 Kibada
 Somangila
 Pemba Mnazi

Kigamboni was formerly an administrative ward within Temeke District of Dar es Salaam. As of 2002, the ward had a total population of 36,701.

Future development
Due to the expansion of economic activities, Dar es Salaam is expanding faster. In the coming few years, it is expected to expand even more and economic activities will increase. Kigamboni has a strong presence with large tracts of good, unexploited land.

According to various studies on the presence of unpolluted beaches, the redevelopment of Kigamboni will spearhead economic development and increase the national income. The big picture of the Kigamboni new city master plan is to provide sufficient infrastructure in order that the residents have a better quality of life and to build a core for developing new land demands of Dar es salaam, such as residential, commercial, trade and business, industrial, educational, and tourism facilities.

Economy
The Kigamboni shopping center is conveniently located near the Kigamboni Ferry Terminal allowing travellers to browse and purchase items whilst they are preparing to alight or after disembarking from the ferry.

Infrastructure

Bridge
The Kigamboni Bridge/Mwl Nyerere Bridge runs from the west of Kigamboni to the east of Kurasini area.

Transport

Maritime transport

Ferry
A ferry crossing from the south east of Kivukoni and the Dar es Salaam central business district to the north west of Kigamboni.

Notable landmarks
TIPER, former refinery presently used as an oil terminal
Kigamboni Naval Base

Gallery

References

Temeke District
Wards of Dar es Salaam Region